East Fork San Juan River is a tributary of the San Juan River in southern Colorado in the United States.  The stream flows from the confluence of Crater Creek and Elwood Creek in Mineral County to a confluence with the West Fork San Juan River in Archuleta County that forms the San Juan River.

See also
 List of rivers of Colorado

References

Rivers of Colorado
Rivers of Archuleta County, Colorado
Rivers of Mineral County, Colorado